Drussyla Andressa Felix Costa (born July 1, 1996 in Rio de Janeiro, Brazil) is a Brazilian beach volleyball player who has represented her country in junior and youth world championships and the South American Beach Volleyball Circuit. She was part of the first U16 Brazil national indoor volleyball team that won gold at the first edition of the first U16 South American Championship. Drussyla was a member of the Brazilian national team that won its first U-23 World Championship in a final against Turkey.

Career

Indoor Volleyball
Drussyla was picked to be a part of Brazil's team in the first U16 South American Championship in Canelones, Uruguay where she took gold with her team. She was named MVP of the tournament.

During the 2015 FIVB Club World Championship, Costa played with the Brazilian club Rexona Ades Rio and her team lost the bronze medal match to the Swiss Voléro Zürich,

Beach Volleyball
Drussyla began representing Brazil in the South American Circuit at the Bolivian Open of the 2012 Continental Cup. Brazil's team took gold, however none of the pairings qualified due to the Olympic Qualification quota for the country already being filled.

Drussyla participated in the 2012 Youth and Yonior Beach Volleyball World Championships, she partnered with Eduarda Santos in the Youth tournament finishing in sixth place, and partnered with Eduarda Santos in the Junior championship, earning the Silver Medal.

Clubs

  Fluminense FC (2011–2013)
  Sesc-RJ (2013–2019)
  SESI Volei Bauru (2020-2021)
  Osasco (2022)

Awards

Individuals
 2011 U16 South American Championship – "Most Valuable Player"
 2014 U20 South American Championship – "Most Valuable Player"
 2018 South American Club Championship – "Best Outside Spiker"

Clubs
 2014–15 Brazilian Superliga –  Champion, with Rexona/Ades
 2015–16 Brazilian Superliga –  Champion, with Rexona/Ades
 2016–17 Brazilian Superliga –  Champion, with Rexona/SESC
 2017–18 Brazilian Superliga –  Runner-up, with SESC Rio
 2017 South American Club Championship –  Champion, with Rexona/SESC
 2018 South American Club Championship –  Runner-up, with SESC Rio
 2017 FIVB Club World Championship –  Runner-up, with Rexona/SESC

References

External links
 

Brazilian women's beach volleyball players
Brazilian women's volleyball players
Volleyball players from Rio de Janeiro (city)
1996 births
Living people
Wing spikers